Chris Dade (born April 5, 1974) is an American former professional basketball player. He played college basketball for Cal State Fullerton and later professionally in Argentina, Iceland and Israel.

Early life
Dade grew up in Tulsa, Oklahoma. Before his freshman year in high school, his family moved to the San Diego area where he attended Vista High School. He later transferred to San Diego El Camino High. He was the schools most valuable player as a junior. As a senior, he averaged 16.5 points, shot 58% from the field and led his team to the San Diego Section Division II championship with a 25–5 record. He was chosen player of the year in the division.

College career
Dade played for Cal State Fullerton from 1994 to 1998. He redshirted his first year due to an injury.

Professional career
In 1999, Dade signed with Úrvalsdeild karla club Haukar. He was released by the club in December 1999 after appearing in 10 games where he averaged 20.6 points and 5.9 rebounds per game.

The following season, Dade signed with Hamar. In January 2001, he was selected for the Icelandic Basketball Association All-Star Game where he scored 11 points. In February, he helped Hamar to the Icelandic Cup finals where it lost to ÍR. For the season, he averaged 26.5 points per game, second best in the league behind KFÍ's Dwayne Fontana, and 3.86 steals per game, also second best in the league. In the Úrvalsdeild playoffs, Hamar lost to Keflavík in the first round 0–2.

In July 1993, Dade returned to Hamar. In 20 games, he averaged 21.6 points and 3.8 rebounds per game.

References

External links 
Úrvalsdeild statistics at Icelandic Basketball Association
College statistics at Sports Reference

1974 births
Living people
American expatriate basketball people in Iceland
American men's basketball players
Cal State Fullerton Titans men's basketball players
Hamar men's basketball players
Haukar men's basketball players
Guards (basketball)
Úrvalsdeild karla (basketball) players